Spelling Challenges and More! is a puzzle video game developed by Supersonic Software and published by Crave Entertainment for the Nintendo DS and PlayStation Portable. In this game, the player must complete multiple different spelling challenges by using the unique features on the Nintendo DS or PlayStation Portable. This game was released in Europe on the Nintendo DS under the name 'Spellbound'.

References

2007 video games
Crave Entertainment games
Nintendo DS games
North America-exclusive video games
PlayStation Portable games
Puzzle video games
Video games developed in the United Kingdom
Supersonic Software games
Single-player video games